La Democracia is a populated settlement located in the nation of Belize. It is a mainland village that is located in Belize District.

It is the location of Belize's zoo and tropical education center. It is also the location of the Georgeville lumber branch. It is near the provincial border of Belize district and Cayo district. The Monkey Bay Wildlife Sanctuary is close to La Democracia.

Populated places in Belize District
Belize Rural Central